Ricardor Manuel was an  coaster which was built in 1940 by Goole Shipbuilding & Repairing Co Ltd, Goole as Empire Cliff for the Ministry of War Transport (MoWT). In 1945 she was sold and renamed Marna. A further sale in 1960 saw her renamed Harcliff. In 1963, she was sold to a Panamanian company and renamed Ricardo Manuel. She sank in 1971 after a collision with another ship at the entrance to Casablanca harbour, Morocco.

Description
The ship was built by Goole Shipbuilding & Repairing Co Ltd, Goole as yard number 357. She was launched on 16 October 1940 and completed in December.

She had a GRT of 873 and a NRT of 459.

The ship was propelled by a 2-stroke Single Cycle Double Acting diesel engine, which had seven cylinders of 9 inches (25 cm) diameter by 16 inches (41 cm) stroke. The engine was built by British Auxiliaries Ltd, Glasgow.

History
Empire Cliff was built for the MoWT. She was placed under the management of F T Everard & Co Ltd. Her port of registry was Goole. The Code Letters MLPK and United Kingdom Official Number 164908 were allocated. In 1946, Empire Cliff was sold to The South Georgia Co Ltd. She was renamed Marna, placed under the management of Christian Salvesen & Co Ltd and her port of registry was changed to Leith. In 1960, Marna was sold to Hargreaves Coal & Shipping Co Ltd, London and was renamed Harcliff.

In 1963, Harcliff was sold to Comonave Cia de Portuguesa de Navegação Ltda, Panama and was renamed Ricardo Manuel. On 4 September 1971, Ricardo Manuel was in collision with the Moroccan registered  in foggy conditions at the entrance to Casablanca harbour. She was cut in two and sunk. Ricardo Manuel was inbound to Casablanca from Lisbon, Portugal.

References

1940 ships
Ships built in Goole
Empire ships
Ministry of War Transport ships
Merchant ships of the United Kingdom
Merchant ships of Panama
Maritime incidents in 1971